Daqiao Subdistrict is a subdistrict of Tianqiao District, Jinan, Shandong province, People's Republic of China, located  north of the Yellow River. Access to downtown Jinan is provided by China National Highway 104 (G104) via the Jinan Yellow River Bridge, while the other major highways passing in the subdistrict's immediate vicinity are G220 and G308. , it has 72 villages under its administration.

See also 
 List of township-level divisions of Shandong

References 

Township-level divisions of Shandong
Jinan